"Reckoning War" is an American comic book event written by Dan Slott with art by Marco Checchetto, published from February to June 2022 by Marvel Comics. This story deals with the Fantastic Four clashing with the Reckoning, a group of aliens derived from a mysterious race called the Prosilicans, who orchestrate multiple alien invasions causing a catastrophic cosmic war, which also features Uatu, Nick Fury, Doctor Doom, the Silver Surfer, the She-Hulk, and the Jack of Hearts. The event received from mixed reviews from critics, with critics criticizing Dan Slott's writing and the art.

Plot

Prelude 
The She-Hulk is taken by the Time Variance Authority due to her actions in the future. The Time Variance Authority take her to the future, where her actions will cause a war between Earth and mysterious beings which will cause the Watchers to break their non-intervention oath. During the trial, the She-Hulk is allowed to continue existing thanks to the Time Variance Authority seeing how much of an effect the She-Hulk has on different people.

After the events of "Empyre", Nick Fury is observing the Fantastic Four and the Avengers celebrating the relocation of the Cotati when Uatu appears out of Nick Fury's eye socket as he investigates those ancient weapons, and tells him that "there shall be a reckoning". As Uatu rebuilds his homebase, he opens his mind to Nick Fury while exploring the visual archives known as the Cyclopedia Universum, where Uatu learns that his siblings bonded Nick Fury with him where Nick Fury was silently watching the universe. Uatu explains that there is a Reckoning War coming, and everyone needs to prepare. While he cannot commute Fury's sentence, he does release him from his chains as Fury makes a new eyepatch.

After helping the TVA deal with Kang the Conqueror's multiple variants, Reed Richards overhears the TVA talk about the Reckoning War.

Main plot 
The Prosilicans are revealed by Uatu to be the enemy who supplied the Coati during "Empyre". One billion years ago, the Prosilicans were one of the first alien races the Watchers (originally known as the Luminous) provided technical support. As their civilization continually thrived due to their lack of ethics, the Prosilicans got greedy and sought to use the Watchers' technology to take over planets creating nuclear weapons and warfare, which caused an all-out war throughout the entire cosmos. The Luminous managed to defeat the Prosilicans but only by destroying nine-tenth of the universe resulting from the toxic fallout of the First War. After their defeat, the Prosilicans were decimated after the Watchers sealed them away from the universe following the creation of an isolated toxic wasteland known as the Barrens. As the Luminous made their vow of non-interference and changed their name to the Watchers, the remaining Prosilicans survived and established the group to spread chaos throughout the galaxy, renaming themselves "the Reckoning" as they swore revenge against the Watchers who imprisoned them. In the present day, the Reckoning are now supplying a group of aliens called the Badoon to invade Earth. Uatu sends out a call for the other Watchers. However, the Reckoning instruct the Badoon to blow up Uatu's headquarters on the Moon. Spider-Man, the Avengers, the X-Men, the Champions, and the Fantastic Four help save civilians from the Moon rubble falling to Earth while dealing with the Badoon invasion. The She-Hulk sees two TVA agents, Justice Peace and Justice Love, observing the chaos before disappearing while the Jack of Hearts gets confused about someone she was talking to, and the Silver Surfer, along with the Griever at the End of All Things, discovers an agonized Eternity (the living embodiment of the Marvel Universe) who was on his deathbed poisoned by the catastrophic cosmic war the Prosilicans orchestrated. The Queen of Nevers (who is nursing Eternity) instructs the Surfer to venture off and find a mysterious remedy to save Eternity from dying. The Fantastic Four meet up with Nick Fury, and Reed Richards accesses Uatu's mind to understand what is going on. Having been manifested by Uatu's Cyclopedia Universum, Reed's mind begins to deteriorate his emotions and personality into a cold and calculating person when he releases the universe at stake. Meanwhile, Wrath, the Reckoning's leader, devises a plan to incite a cosmic war to take down Watchers as he sends the Badoon to Earth.

In Raj-Lek, Wrath slaughters all the Recluses, including the Watcher Qyre as he taunts him for his eternal silence and non-interference while Reed Richards broadcasts a message to all the heroes on Earth to help them fight this invasion and contact the Silver Surfer. After gazing at Eternity, the Surfer informs Reed and the team that the Prosilicans gave Watcher-level technology to lesser-known warlike conquerors, causing multiple invasions and chaos throughout the cosmos: the Badoon invading Earth, the Morani assaulting the Shi'ar Empire, the Mekkans laying waste to the Kree-Skrull Alliance, and the Annihilation Wave attacking the planet Spyre (home of the cosmic ray hosts known as the Unparalleled). With Johnny Storm flying off to help the Spyricans, Jack Hart volunteering for assistance, Susan Storm disappearing out of sight, and Nick Fury teleporting to the Watchers' homebase of Planet T-37X, Reed Richards tells everyone to go help out the Watcher fight off the Prosilicans as best they can. Meanwhile, Doctor Doom arrives at Camp Hammond to retrieve a powerful weapon that can help him provide live bait.

At the Watchers' homebase, Uatu arrives after surviving the explosion and tried to convince the other Watchers to take down the Prosilicans from rising again; however, he was imprisoned by his father, Ikor. Reed, the Thing, the She-hulk, and the Jack of Hearts arrive in Shi'ar space to protect the M'kraan Crystal, but they are too late when they discover the army of Morani under the leadership of Rapture and Reject of the Reckoning invertedly defeated the Imperial Guard. The Thing recognizes her from his future vision that she is the one who might kill him as he pleads to Reed and Reed tells the Thing that him accessing Uatu's mind will cause him to die in three days. During the battle, Rapture gravely injures the Thing as she takes the crystal along with Reject, and the She-Hulk realizes why this is her fault after learning where they are heading. The Silver Surfer and Thor meet up in Asgard along with other former heralds of Galactus as they fuse the Destroyer and Galactus together into a single sentient being known as Destruction. Using the Ultimate Nullifier as a conduct, the Silver Surfer lures Destruction to confront the Reckoning as he departs Asgard to save Eternity. Johnny Storm arrives on the planet Spyre and successfully defeats Annihilus by taking his control rod and his ships while sparing him. Storm learns that Sky and Citadel are soulmates now and Sky has acknowledged Citadel as her hero, so he asks the Unparalleled for his help and they all agree.

The Badoon, led by Ruin of the Reckoning, attack and storm the Baxter Building, in which Reed receives contact from Valeria and instructs her to initiate Protocol: Zero. After Reed Richards and Jack heal the Thing, he confesses to him that Reed's children (Franklin Richards and Valeria Richards), Alicia Masters, and their children (N'kalla and Jo-Venn) self-destructed the building to help stall the Proscilians. Arriving at Raj-Lek, the She-Hulk reveals to the Jack of Hearts that she was a judge siding with a group of aliens called the Recluses to hide their privacy from the Watchers by removing Qyre's mouth to silence him, resulting in Raj-Lek's destruction.

The She-Hulk and the Jack of Hearts encounter Wrath, but are quickly defeated. Enraged by Reed's confession, Ben nearly beats Reed to death until Reed shows the video of Ben's family alive. As Ben is tearfully relieved, Reed explains that he never caused their children to self-destruct and only used a decoy to make sure the Thing was not distracted, as Reed notices that Ben is often unfocused when fighting the enemy. Wrath sets up a trap, leaving Reed and the Thing stranded within the Barrens with the She-Hulk and the Jack of Hearts. Doctor Doom uses the artifact to summon a mysterious being to take down the Proscilians. Johnny and the Unparalleled arrive at Anelle-vell, capital of the Kree-Skrull Empire, to provide aid for Wiccan and Emperor Hulking along with the Guardians of the Galaxy and the Starjammers to fend off against the Mekkan army.

From the Baxter Building, it is revealed that Franklin, Valeria, Alicia, N'kalla, and Jo-Venn were unharmed and Protocol: Zero is meant as a failsafe to sabotage the Forever Gate, preventing Ruins from gaining access to it. Ruins reveals to them that the Prosicilans' plan is not to destroy the universe, but to gain control of three existing Nexuses of Reality, including the M'kraan Crystal. As Ruins departs with the remaining Badoon, Franklin and Valeria follow him right before the Forever Gate permanently shuts down, much to Alicia's concern. On Earth, the alien warrior known as Cormorant arrives to retrieve his armor under the instruction of his master, Helmsman. Along the way to locating those missing parts, he overpowers the Great Lakes Avengers, Gauntlet, and Southpaw as he brutally strips their gauntlets and the Grasshopper's chausses before his encounter with Doctor Doom. While confronting Cormorant in the Florida Everglades, Doctor Doom realizes that the Tactigon, the weapon he stole from Camp Hammond, was the Watcher-level technology Helmsman sought to retrieve and that Cormorant was a soldier of the First War, much to Helmsman's underestimation of Doom's intelligence. Doom persuades Cormorant to aid him as his ally to fight against the Reckoning as he summons Helmsman and kills him in exchange for his freedom, and Cormorant accepts his offer with respect.

Johnny Storm gathers everyone from across the universe, including Ego the Living Planet, to unite against the Reckoning who orchestrated the war against them. After reuniting with the She-Hulk and the Jack of Hearts in the Barrens, Reed clarifies to Ben that there is no way out of the Barrens even though he has the Watchers' knowledge; the Watchers cannot teleport them from there. Now fully armed with M'krann Crystal shards for his armor, Wrath and his army arrive at the Watchers' homebase to initiate the attack after killing the Watcher guard while Ikor (who is fully aware of the Prosilicans' invasion) refuses to delay the Cyclopedia Universum and sends Emnu to Dar-Kenda to check on "the Apex on All Reality". As Fury attempts to free Uatu from torture, the new vision appears and displays a shocking truth: after an alternate Reed killed Galactus, the Zero Energy which Galactus sustains began to grow unstable, resulting in Earth's catastrophic disaster as well as the entire universe. Uatu is finally confirmed that his interference inadvertently saved everyone's lives and Ikor's claims of non-interference are entirely false. Emnu arrives and attacks them until he is stunned by the Invisible Woman. Susan revealed that she has been following Fury this whole time as well as spying on the Watchers. During her mission, she overheard Ikor's instructions and follows Emnu to "the Apex". Uatu explains to them that "the Apex of All Reality" is a gateway to multiple possibilities which the Watchers observed any What If worlds they can imagine. Uatu also revealed that the Watchers originated from Planet Lumina and Planet T-39X is "the Apex"s homeworld. After their homeworld of Lumina was destroyed by the First War and their encounter with "the Apex", the Watchers settled on T-37X as their new home and decided to safeguard it from outside threats. Susan deduces that Reed and Ikor both foresaw the Reckoning's plan on taking control of "the Apex", which they were trying to prevent.

Uatu grew suspicious about the Watchers' secrecy as he looks into Emnu's mind and was shocked to learn that Emnu is responsible for obliterating nine-tenth of the universe. It is revealed that Emnu created the Ultimate Nullifier, which he used to help eradicate the Prosilicans and end the First War. Uatu confirmed that the Watchers were responsible for the destruction, which was also the main cause of their vow of non-inference. In outer space, the Surfer receives warning from the Never-Queen, the Griever, and the Eternity about the Reckoning's arrival for the Apex as he outpaces Destruction to the Watchers' homeworld for stalling the Reckoning while leaving his cosmic trace behind. Valeria hijacks the Forever Gate and sets up a trap for Ruins and his soldiers in the Thought Space, a dimension where a person's every thought manifests into a reality, allowing Franklin to summon his reality-warping powers to subdue them. Meanwhile, in the Barrens, the side-effect of the Cyclopedia Universum causes Reed's brain to begin to expand, transforming him into a Watcher-like being which allows him to bestow the Watchers' power and increased intelligence, learning that he has less than 10 hours from dying. This side effect allows Reed to rebuild the Forever Gate and requires Zero Energy to activate it, while the Jack of Hearts has the power to summon Zero Energy. As Reed and Ben depart, the She-Hulk opposes this but Jack, however, chooses to remain stranded within the Barrens as he blasts her to the Forever Gate. On Planet T-37X, the Reckoning encounters the Watcher as Wrath tosses the shard, releasing the Barrens' toxic gas on them as a reminder of his people's suffering.

While arriving on Planet T-37X, the Surfer reunites with Reed, the Thing, and the She-Hulk along with Sue Storm, Fury, and Uatu to help the Watchers as Reed confesses to the team that he is dying from the Watchers' knowledge and kept his secret from them. Uatu understood this as he tries to reconnect with his people by revealing the truth of Emnu's actions and the Watchers' responsibilities while Fury stays to protect him. Doom and Commorant arrive in time to confront the Reckoning, in which Commorant tears Reject apart, Rapture disarms Doom, and Wrath subdues Commorant by reprogramming his armor. As Rapture is about to kill Doom, the Fantastic Four and the Silver Surfer arrive to make their final stand against them, and Wrath informs Rapture to retrieve the Ultimate Nullifier while the Thing challenges her for a rematch, with Susan swapping Rapture's blade for good use. As the team try to prevent Wrath from reaching "the Apex", Reed sensed Destruction's arrival preparing the destroy the planet. Johnny Storm and the galactic alliances arrive on time to stall Destruction, allowing Johnny to rejoin his team. However, Wrath overwhelms them while Reed makes his confession to Sue about his realization and accepts his fate. After defeating Rapture, the Thing manages to recover the Ultimate Nullifier and send it to Reed before passing out. As Wrath approaches "the Apex of All Reality" to reclaim it, Reed Richards sacrifices himself by activating the Ultimate Nullifier, which erases Wrath from existence.

As the Unparalleled evacuate the Watchers to Ego from Planet T-39X's destruction and Galactus's heralds occupy Destruction, Fury chooses to stay behind on protecting Uatu where he overwhelmingly absorbs all the toxic gas and the Cyclopedia Universums knowledge as they fall into "the Apex". Despite his sacrifice, Reed Richards is miraculously cured, reverting to his former self because of the Ultimate Nullifier, which neutralized most of the Watchers' energy from him. Reed deduces that the Ultimate Nullifier only works on Watchers and Doom claims that it was a logical outcome. With Wrath nullified, the M'Krann Crystal shards become unstable and begin their self-destruction along with the planet. The Human Torch and the Silver Surfer carry the shards to Destruction while the Invisible Woman activates her invisible force field to help the team escape Planet T-39X's destruction. Eternity, the Griever, and the Queen of Nevers congratulate Norrin Radd and Johnny Storm for their actions in saving the galaxy and confirm that the First War is finally over. As they watch Planet T-39X's destruction, Uatu emerges, now imbued with cosmic power from "the Apex", and addressing himself as the One and Only Watcher. Uatu acknowledges the cause of all the death and destruction from the Watchers' interference and decides to bring forth a reckoning by rectifying all of their actions. Uatu teleports them to the very edge of existence known as the Great Barriers, where they find the remnants of the First War covered by the Barrens. Uatu erases all the toxic Barrens from existence and invertedly recovers the destroyed nine-tenths of the universe, renaming it the Borderlands, which he describes as the Canvas of Infinite Possibility. Uatu's action allows the Jack of Hearts to reunite with the She-Hulk right when the TVA agents arrive to ensure Galactus's resurrection. With Galactus now reborn from his fusion with the Destroyer, Galactus feels a hunger for knowledge and asks for the Silver Surfer's aid, and the Surfer addresses Galactus as his companion while escorting him to the Borderlands for new discoveries. With their tasks complete and the universe saved, Uatu sends everyone home to restore the damage the Prosilicans have done while the Fantastic Four go their separate ways: Johnny chooses to stay with the Unparalleled for the cure, Ben wishes to see his family from his departure, Reed and Susan return to the Forever Gate to check on their children, and Doom makes his farewell departure with Cormorant.

Uatu restores the M'Krann Crystal with Emnu, Ruins, and Rapture encased inside it. Cormorant is welcomed by the Shi'ar Imperial Guard and decides to safeguard the crystal. Reed and Susan check on Valeria and Franklin and learned that they were inside the Thought Space. Valeria used her imagination to create the new Forever Gate. However, Franklin wanted to stay there for his cosmic powers. Reed and Susan convinced Franklin they loved him as their son and would not want anything else more than his powers and Franklin joins them for a reunion. After learning about the Zero Energy containment, the Richards family decides to deactivate the gate, believing that it is too dangerous to leave it open. Meanwhile, on the rooftop of the Baxter building, Ben reunites with his family while meeting up with the Avengers following the Badoon's defeat. The Grimms were shockingly surprised to see Uatu rebuilding the Earth's Moon. With his homebase restored, Uatu rebuilds a new Watchtower for Fury and entrusts him to secure the Ultimate Nullifier as the Unseen and humanity's shield. Meanwhile, in Latveria, Doctor Doom secretly plans to build his own Forever Gate after scanning all the data recorded from his armor.

Tie-in issue
While Uatu was imprisoned in Dar-kenda (the Watchers' prison), Ikor takes Uatu to "the Seat of All Knowledge" for interrogation. When he extracts Uatu's visions, Ikor suspects that Uatu has been hiding one What If vision he never wanted to show anyone: "What If Uatu The Watcher Had Never Interfered?" In this alternate universe, the Silver Surfer arrives on Earth and sends the message allowing Galactus to invade Earth without Uatu's warning of the upcoming threat, and the Fantastic Four were overwhelmed by Galactus's power without Uatu providing information, preparation, and support, in which they did not learn about the Ultimate Nullifier that could stop Galactus from destroying Earth. Their battle with Galactus and the Surfer left Susan suffering from blindness, Reed's body melting, Johnny burning, and Ben undergoing multiple cracks and scars. Instead of using the Ultimate Nullifier, Reed built a device known as the Ultimate Nullification Ray that helps kill Galactus without knowing the consequence of Galactus's presence and the Surfer departs in relief without acknowledging the lessons of humanity, leaving the alternate version of Uatu's satisfaction of non-intervention. Realizing the vision he saw is confoundedly false, Uatu pleads with Ikor to release him. However, Ikor ignores him as he had brainwashed him and falsely claimed that Uatu's intervention was a mistake, forcing Uatu to submit in despair and regret. After hearing the conversation about the Great Gathering and Ikor's tolerance of Uatu's warning, Fury decides to free Uatu without any other Watchers detecting his presence.

Reading order 
 Fantastic Four (vol. 6) #39 (prelude)
 Fantastic Four: Reckoning War Alpha #1
 Fantastic Four (vol. 6) #40
 Fantastic Four (vol. 6) #41
 Reckoning War: Trial of the Watcher #1 (tie-in)
 Fantastic Four (vol. 6) #42
 Fantastic Four (vol. 6) #43
 Fantastic Four (vol. 6) #44
 Fantastic Four (vol. 6) #45 (epilogue)

Critical reception 
According to Comic Book Roundup, Fantastic Four: Reckoning War Alpha #1 received an average rating of 7.5 out of 10 based on six reviews.

According to Comic Book Roundup, Fantastic Four (vol. 6) #40 received an average rating of 7.7 out of 10 based on six reviews.

According to Comic Book Roundup, Fantastic Four (vol. 6) #41 received an average rating of 6.7 out of 10 based on three reviews.

According to Comic Book Roundup, Reckoning War: Trial of the Watcher #1 received an average rating of 8.1 out of 10 based on eleven reviews.

According to Comic Book Roundup, Fantastic Four (vol. 6) #42 received an average rating of 7.3 out of 10 based on five reviews.

According to Comic Book Roundup, Fantastic Four (vol. 6) #43 received an average rating of 7 out of 10 based on five reviews.

According to Comic Book Roundup, Fantastic Four (vol. 6) #44 received an average rating of 6.9 out of 10 based on four reviews.

According to Comic Book Roundup, Fantastic Four (vol. 6) #45 received an average rating of 7.1 out of 10 based on five reviews.

Collected editions

References 

Alien invasions in comics
Fictional wars
Fantastic Four storylines